The Muncy School District is small, rural, public school district located in southern Lycoming County. The school serves the borough of Muncy, plus the affiliated townships of Muncy Township and Muncy Creek Township. The mascot of the school is the Indian. According to 2000 federal census data, it served a resident population of 7,209. By 2010, the district's population declined to 7,042 people. The educational attainment levels for the population 25 and over were 87.2% high school graduates and 19.8% college graduates.

According to the Pennsylvania Budget and Policy Center, 32.8% of the district's pupils lived at 185% or below the Federal Poverty Level  as shown by their eligibility for the federal free or reduced price school meal programs in 2012. The district residents' per capita income was $17,107, while the median family income was just $39,678. In Lycoming County, the median household income was $45,430. In the Commonwealth, the median family income was $49,501 and the United States median family income was $49,445, in 2010. By 2013, the median household income in the United States rose to $52,100.

The Muncy School District operates 2 schools: Ward L. Myers Elementary School (grades K–6) and Muncy Junior-Senior High School (grades 7–12). Both schools have been accredited by the Middle States Association of Colleges and Schools. High school students can attend the Lycoming Career and Technology Center for training in the building trades, drafting & design careers, criminal justice careers, allied health careers, culinary arts and other careers. The Muncy School District contracts with the BLaST Intermediate Unit No. 17 for services such as psychological testing, preemployment criminal background screening, occupational and physical therapy services.

Extracurriculars

The Muncy School District offers a wide variety of clubs, activities and 20 sports. Muncy School District is affiliated with Heartland Conference and the Northern Tier League in Football. Several sports are offered in cooperation with Montgomery Area School District.

Sports
The district funds:

Boys
Baseball - AA
Basketball - AA
Football  - A
Soccer - A
Tennis - AA
Wrestling - AA

Girls
Basketball - AA
Field hockey - A
Soccer - A
Softball - A
Tennis - AA

Junior high school sports

Boys
Basketball
Football
Wrestling 

Girls
Basketball
Field hockey
Softball

According to PIAA directory July 2016

References

School districts in Lycoming County, Pennsylvania
Susquehanna Valley